Julie Fahey is an American Democratic politician currently serving as the Majority Leader in the Oregon House of Representatives. She represents the 14th district, which covers parts of Lane County, including Junction City and western Eugene.

Career
Fahey graduated from the University of Notre Dame in 2000. Fahey served as Treasurer of the Democratic Party of Oregon from 2015 to 2017, and was chair of the Lane County Democratic Party from 2012 to 2014.

In October 2015, Fahey announced her candidacy for the House seat vacated by Val Hoyle, who retired in order to run for Oregon Secretary of State. She defeated James Manning Jr. in the Democratic primary with 60% of the vote, and in the general election defeated Republican Kathy Lamberg with 52% of the vote.

References

External links
 Campaign website
 Legislative website

21st-century American politicians
21st-century American women politicians
Date of birth missing (living people)
Living people
Democratic Party members of the Oregon House of Representatives
People from Illinois
Politicians from Eugene, Oregon
Women state legislators in Oregon
Year of birth missing (living people)
Notre Dame College of Arts and Letters alumni